Robert Schneider (25 February 1809, Dresden - 21 October 1885, Hamburg) was a German portrait painter who worked in Hamburg and Lübeck. He was one of the first portraitists in that area to move from the earlier Romanticized style to more nearly pictorial representations.

Life and work 
He was the son of a Court Counselor and studied at the Dresden Academy of Fine Arts with Heinrich Gotthold Arnold. In 1832, he made the acquaintance of the art historian, Carl Friedrich von Rumohr, who became his patron and convinced him to relocate to Northern Germany. Over the next decade, he visited Schleswig (1834), Plön (1835, 1837, 1841) and Kiel (1836, 1840). An extended study trip in 1842 took him to Italy, via Paris.

Most of his subjects were notable members of the Hanseatic bourgeoisie and merchant classes.

In 1928, a large number of his paintings were part of the exhibition "Hamburger Bildnisse" at the Staatliche Kunstsammlungen Dresden. A major retrospective of his work was included in "Hamburger Schule – Das 19. Jahrhundert neu entdeckt", in 2019 at the Hamburger Kunsthalle. His works may be seen at the Behnhaus in Lübeck and the Hamburger Kunsthalle.

References

Further reading 
 Schneider, Robert. In: Hans Vollmer (Ed.): Allgemeines Lexikon der Bildenden Künstler von der Antike bis zur Gegenwart, Vol.30: Scheffel–Siemerding. E. A. Seemann, Leipzig 1936, pg.197.
 "Schneider, Robert". In: Der neue Rump. Lexikon der bildenden Künstler Hamburgs, Altonas und der näheren Umgebung., Revised edition, Kay Rump, Maike Bruhns, Carsten Meyer-Tönnesmann (Eds.), Wachholtz, Neumünster 2005, pps.404–405.
 Robert Schneider from the Lübeckische Blätter, Vol. 41, @ Google Books

External links 

1809 births
1885 deaths
19th-century German painters
19th-century German male artists
German portrait painters
Dresden Academy of Fine Arts
Artists from Dresden